The women's team event at the 2004 Summer Olympics in Athens, Greece, took place at the Athens Olympic Aquatic Centre from 26 to 27 August. The Russian synchronized swimmers (led by Olympic duet champions Anastasia Davydova and Anastasia Ermakova) delivered a superb performance to defend their Olympic title in the event, having received a straight line of five perfect marks from the judges for a composite score of 99.501. Japan maintained a silver-medal streak on its second Olympics by a single point short of Russia's score with 98.501, after displaying their explosive lifts and quick changes of pattern throughout the routine. Having failed to secure an Olympic medal in the sport from the previous Olympics, the U.S. squad assembled a colorful demonstration of multiple sequences and flying leaps to hold on for the bronze with a score of 97.418.

Eight teams competed, each consisting of eight swimmers (from a total team of nine swimmers). There was a single round of competition. Each team presents two routines: a technical routine and a free routine. The technical routine consists of twelve required elements, which must be completed in order and within a time of between 2 minutes 35 seconds and 3 minutes 5 seconds. The free routine has no restrictions other than time; this routine must last between 3 minutes 45 seconds and 4 minutes 15 seconds.

For each routine, the team is judged by two panels of five judges each. One panel is the technical jury, the other is the artistic jury. Each judge gives marks of between 0 and 10. The highest and lowest score from each panel are dropped, leaving a total of six scores which are then summed to give the routine's score. The scores of the two routines are then added to give a final score for the team.

Schedule 
All times are Beijing Standard Time UTC+8

Results

References

External links
Official Olympic Report

Team
2004 in women's sport
Women's events at the 2004 Summer Olympics